Jack David Zipes (born June 7, 1937) is a professor emeritus of German, comparative literature, and cultural studies, who has published and lectured on German literature, critical theory, German Jewish culture, children's literature, and folklore. In the latter part of his career he translated two major editions of the tales of the Brothers Grimm and focused on fairy tales, their evolution, and their social and political role in civilizing processes.

According to Zipes, fairy tales "serve a meaningful social function, not just for compensation but for revelation: the worlds projected by the best of our fairy tales reveal the gaps between truth and falsehood in our immediate society". His arguments are avowedly based on the critical theory of the Frankfurt School and more recently theories of cultural evolution.

Education and positions
Jack David Zipes was born on June 7, 1937, in New York City, to Celia (Rifkin) and Phillip P. Zipes. He received a BA in political science from Dartmouth College in 1959 and an MA in English and comparative literature at Columbia University in 1960. From there, Zipes studied at the University of Munich in 1962 and the University of Tübingen in 1963. He earned his PhD in comparative literature (with a dissertation on the Romantic hero in German and American literature) from Columbia in 1965. It was published as a book, The Great Refusal: Studies of the Romantic Hero in German and American Literature in 1970 and was influenced by the works of Herbert Marcuse.

After teaching American literature at the University of Munich (1966-1967), Zipes taught German literature and drama, comparative folklore and literary theory (specializing in the Frankfurt School) at New York University (1967-1972), the University of Wisconsin–Milwaukee (1972-1986) and the University of Florida (1986-1989) before moving to the department of German, Scandinavian, and Dutch at the University of Minnesota, where he was department chair (1994-1998) and is currently professor emeritus of German.

While teaching at the University of Minnesota, he founded and directed Neighborhood Bridges at the Children's Theater Company, a nationally and internationally acclaimed storytelling program for children, from 1997 to 2008. In addition, he co-founded the prominent journal of German studies, New German Critique, in 1972 and wrote or edited numerous essays for this journal until 1987. While at the University of Minnesota, he also became the director of the Center for German and European Studies, established with aid from the German cultural institute DAAD. He has also held notable visiting professorships in the theater department of the Free University of Berlin (1978-1979), the German department of Columbia University (1984). the Institute for Children's literature at Goethe University in Frankfurt am Main (1981–82), and in the English Department of Anglia Ruskin University in Cambridge (2013). He translated the complete 1857 edition of fairy tales of the Brothers Grimm in 1987, and in 2014, he published the first edition of 1812 and 1815 as The Original Folk and Fairy Tales of the Brothers Grimm along with a new study of the tales, Grimm Legacies: The Magic Power of the Grimms' Folk and Fairy Tales.

During his retirement in 2008, he established a major series of literary fairy tales with Princeton University Press called Oddly Modern Fairy Tales. This series is ongoing and includes works by Kurt Schwitters, Naomi Mitchiison, Lafcadio Hearn, and  Edouard Laboulaye, edited by writers such as Philip Pullman, Marina Warner, and Michael Rosen.

In 2018, Zipes founded the publishing house Little Mole and Honey Bear, which publishes unusual books for children and adults largely produced from 1910-1940. These books, such as Christian Baermann's The Giant Ohl and Tiny Tim (2018) and Paul Valliant-Couturier's  Johnny Breadless (2019),  celebrate the poetic power of fantasy and illustrate how writers and artists have used their art to generate hope in their readers.

Awards and honors
 College of Liberal Arts Scholars of the College, University of Minnesota, 1997
 Fulbright (1981-1982)
 Guggenheim Fellow, 1988
 McKnight
 National Endowment for the Humanities
 Thomas D. Clark Lectureship, University of Kentucky, 1993
 International Brothers Grimm Award, 1999
 Distinguished Scholar, International Association for the Fantastic in the Arts, 1992
Katharine Briggs Award from the Folklore Society, 2007
Mythopoeic  Scholarship Award, 2012
Chicago Folklore Prize, 2015
IRSCL (International Research Society for Children's Literature Award, 2017
Zipes received a Lifetime Achievement Award at the 2019 World Fantasy Awards.

Selected bibliography
For a more complete list (including creative writing) see Zipes' biography on the website of his publishing house.

Author
 Breaking the Magic Spell: Radical Theories of Folk and Fairy Tales (1979)
 Fairy Tales and the Art of Subversion: The Classical Genre for Children and the Process of Civilization (1982)
 The Complete Fairy Tales of the Brothers Grimm (1987, updated with additional tales in both 1992 and 2002)
 Beauties, Beasts and Enchantments: Classic French Fairy Tales (1989)
 The Operated Jew: Two Tales of Antisemitism (1991)
 Fairy Tale As Myth, Myth As Fairy Tale (1994)
 Creative Storytelling: Building Community/Changing Lives (1995)
 Happily Ever After: Fairy Tales, Children and the Culture Industry (1997)
 Sticks and Stones: The Troublesome Success of Children's Literature from Slovenly Peter to Harry Potter (2000)
 The Brothers Grimm: From Enchanted Forests to the Modern World (2002, 2003)
 Speaking Out: Storytelling and Creative Drama for Children (2004)
 Why Fairy Tales Stick: The Evolution and Relevance of a Genre (2006)
 The Enchanted Screen: The Unknown History of Fairy-Tale Films (2011)
 Literature and Literary Theory: Fairy Tales and the Art of Subversion (2011)
 The Irresistible Fairy Tale: The Cultural and Social History of a Genre (2012)
 Grimm Legacies: The Magic Spell of the Grimms’ Folk and Fairy Tales (2014)
The Sorcerer's Apprentice: An Anthology of Magical Tales (2017)
Fearess Ivan and His Faithful Horse Double-Hump (2018)
Smack-Bam, or the Art of Governing Men (2018)
Ernst Bloch, The Pugnacious Philosopher of Hope (2019)
Johnny Breadless. A Pacifist Fairy Tale (2020)

Translated into Chinese:
Fairy Tale Studies: Essays by Jack Zipes. Translated & edited by Juwen Zhang. Jinan: Tomorrow Publishing House, 2022.

Editor
 Political Plays for Children: The Grips Theatre of Berlin (1976)
 Victorian Fairy Tales: The Revolt of the Fairies and Elves (1984)
 Don't Bet on the Prince: Contemporary Feminist Fairy Tales in North America and England (1987)
 Fairy Tales and Fables from Weimar Days (1990, updated and revised 2018)
 Spells of Enchantment: The Wondrous Fairy Tales of Western Culture (1991)
 The Trials and Tribulations of Little Red Riding Hood (1993)
 Outspoken Princess and the Gentle Knight: A Treasury of Modern Fairy Tales (1994)
 Yale Companion to Jewish Writing and Thought in German Culture, 1096-1996 (1997)
 When Dreams Come True (1998)
 The Oxford Companion to Fairy Tales (2000)
 The Great Fairy Tale Tradition: From Straparola and Basile to the Brothers Grimm (2001)
 Italian Popular Tales (2001)
 Unlikely History: The Changing German-Jewish Symbiosis, 1945-2000 (2002)
 Aesop's Fables (2004)
 Beautiful Angiola: The Great Treasury of Sicilian Folk and Fairy Tales (2004)
 Myth, Symbol, and Meaning in Mary Poppins: Children's Literature and Culture (2006)
 The Oxford Encyclopedia of Children's Literature [4 volumes] (2006)
 Beauties, Beasts and Enchantments: Classic French Fairy Tales (2009)
 The Enchanted Screen: The Unknown History of Fairy Tale Films (2010)
 The-cloak-of-dreams: Strange and fantastical, Chinese fairy tales of Béla Balázs (2011)
 The Golden Age of Folk and Fairy Tales: From the Brothers Grimm to Andrew Lang (2013)
 The Original Folk and Fairy Tales of the Brothers Grimm: The Complete First Edition (2014)
 Fairy-Tale Films Beyond Disney: International Perspectives (2015)
The Sorcerer's Apprentice: An Anthology of Magical Tales (2017)
Tales of Wonder: retelling Fairy Tales through Picture Postcards (2017)
Smack-Bam, or The Art of Governing Men: The Political Fairy Tales of Edouard Laboulaye (2018)
The Castle of Truth and Other Revolutionary Tales (2020). Edited translations of political fairy tales by Hermynia Zur Mühlen.

References

External links

Bibliography of Jack Zipes at the University of Minnesota (UMN)
Jack Zipes - Are Fairy tales still useful to Children? One hour interview from the Art of Storytelling with Brother Wolf Show.
Jack Zipes Interview
A 2002 bibliography of Jack Zipes publications 
SurLaLune-Listing of Jack Zipe's books 
Education/Positions at UMN
Jack Zipes lecture "Fairy Tales, Child Abuse, and 'Childism'" November, 2012 at UMN
 Peter Shea interviews Jack Zipes 2014 at UMN
Jack Zipes Interview Transcription: Utah State University, Oral Histories of American Folklorists Digital Collection
 

1937 births
Living people
Columbia Graduate School of Arts and Sciences alumni
University of Minnesota faculty
20th-century American male writers
21st-century American male writers
Fairy tale scholars
Dartmouth College alumni